was a Japanese pop and jazz composer. Katsuhisa Hattori is his son. He had a great influence on Japanese pop and was awarded the People's Honor Award. Japanese jazz was downtrodden during World War II, but he created a jazz boom after the war. He composed many songs for various artists such as Noriko Awaya, Shizuko Kasagi, Ichimaru and Ichirō Fujiyama. He also composed Li Xianglan's song , which has remained controversial in China despite not being a militaristic song.

References

1907 births
1993 deaths
20th-century Japanese musicians
20th-century jazz composers
Japanese jazz composers
Male jazz composers
Musicians from Osaka
People's Honour Award winners
20th-century Japanese male musicians
Presidents of the Japan Composer's Association